Aspidoglossa ruficollis is a species of ground beetle in the subfamily Scaritinae. It was described by Putzeys in 1866.

References

Scaritinae
Beetles described in 1866